"U16 Girls" is the second single released from Indie band Travis' debut album, Good Feeling. The single was released on 1 April 1997 in the United Kingdom.

Background
In an interview with NME, Fran Healy described the song as, "A tongue-in-cheek warning about the dangers of getting into a relationship with a girl who, despite looking much older, is actually under the legal age of consent." As the age of consent in Scotland is 16, Healy named the song "U16 Girls". The single's artwork depicts a surfboard which was designed by The Stone Roses guitarist John Squire. The surfboard is decorated with lyrics from Beach Boys songs. The single charted at number forty on the UK Singles Chart.

Track listing
 UK CD Single
 "U16 Girls" (Featuring The Joyous Lake Singers) - 4:00
 "Hazy Shades Of Gold" - 3:18
 "Good Time Girls" - 4:09 
 "Good Feeling" (4-Track) - 3:55

 7" Vinyl / Cassette Single
 "U16 Girls" (Featuring The Joyous Lake Singers) - 4:00
 "Hazy Shades Of Gold" - 3:18
 "Good Time Girls" - 4:09

References

1997 singles
Travis (band) songs
Song recordings produced by Steve Lillywhite
1997 songs
Songs written by Fran Healy (musician)
Independiente (record label) singles